is a Japanese manga series written and illustrated by Hiro. It has been serialized online via Shueisha's Tonari no Young Jump website since August 2016, with the chapters collected in eleven tankōbon volumes. An anime television series adaptation produced by CloverWorks aired from January to March 2022.

Plot
Throughout her young life, Komichi has always adored sailor attire-(being inspired by her idol Miki Fukumoto), even going so far as to have her mother Yuwa make a sailor-style school uniform for her when she enters middle school. When she gets accepted to her mother's old private school Roubai Girls' Academy, she is delighted that she'll get to wear her homemade uniform; once arriving at her new school, she is surprised to find out that Roubai's dress code no longer uses sailor uniforms and have been replaced with blazers instead. Despite the circumstances, the school's headmistress happily makes an exception and allows her to wear the traditional sailor uniform. As she goes through her years of early adolescence, even experiencing some struggles along the way, she meets and befriends many of her school peers and enjoys her school life.

Characters

Roubai Academy Class 1-3

 Seat 1: A first year middle school student/the titular protagonist and is a graduate of Futaba Elementary School who has recently been accepted to the elite all-girls Roubai Academy, the same school her mother Yuwa attended when she was her age; since she was a child, she's had a fascination for sailor attire as well as sailor school uniforms. She eventually gets her mother to make her one, an exact replica to her mother's school uniform, for her first day of school. Once she arrives at the school's entrance ceremony, she at first feels out of place due to her sailor school uniform, which happens to be Roubai Academy's original dress code from when Yuwa was a student there. Meanwhile, the other students are wearing blazer-styled school uniforms instead. Despite the misunderstanding, Komichi is happily given permission by the principal to wear the sailor uniform, making her the only student in the school and her class to wear the school's original uniform design. While she attends her new school and living out her adolescent years, she hopes to make hundreds of friends. At the school, she quickly becomes popular for her extroverted personality and joins the school's drama club.

 Seat 2: A mischievous student who is originally from Tokyo. She is Kizaki's dormmate, and befriends Akebi on her first day. A member of the softball club, Usagihara is known among her classmates for cooking and baking various food for her schoolmates, having a kitchen in her dormitory, as well as her poor grades. She went to the same cram school as Tatsumori.

 Seat 3: An inquisitive girl. Ohkuma does not like socializing, preferring instead to take notes of people while observing them in the hopes of using it in the future. She also takes notes of various wild animals she sees. In the anime, she shares a dorm with Togeguchi.

 Seat 4: A girl with the tendency to sleep a lot. She is Usagihara's roommate.

 Seat 5: A girl from Tokyo and the first person who Komichi meets on her first day of school, quickly becoming her best friend. She hails from a rich family as her family back at home owns and lives in a mansion. When feeling nervous or anxious, she has a habit of using her nail clippers, saying that the sound of the clippers are a therapeutic relief for her; she has learned many hobbies, such as playing the violin, piano, and horseback riding, but ultimately joins the climbing club.

 Seat 6: A shy, quiet girl with glasses who is originally from Nagano Prefecture. She is a bookworm and thus a member of the literature club.

 Seat 7: A self-conscious girl who used to play tennis.

 Seat 8: A studious, serious student. She is the class vice president and a member of the track club.

 Seat 9: The class president. She gives off the aura of a tough, no-nonsense student and thus is somewhat unpopular, but Akebi befriends her anyway, causing Tanigawa to fall in love with her. She is a member of the photography club, as well as the best student in the class academically.

 Seat 10: A loner girl and Ohkuma's roommate. She has twin-tailed hair. Tougeguchi suffers from severe anxiety to the point of taking medication, which Akebi assists her with. She is a member of the table tennis club.

 Seat 11: A girl in the basketball club.

 Seat 12: A friendly, popular girl in the school's volleyball club.

 Seat 13: A girl from Kansai and a member of the swim team. She is playful and competitive, but does not perform well academically.

 Seat 14: A sweet and soft-spoken girl in Komichi's class with the height of a grade schooler, making her one of the shortest students in her class.  

 Seat 15: A girl with a penchant for punk rock and Togano's roommate. Despite her love for music, she initially cannot read music, though she eventually learns the guitar.

 Seat 16: A tall, stoic girl whose only interest is volleyball, and is thus a member of the volleyball club. She is subsequently Nawashiro's best friend.

Others

Komichi and Kao's mother and Sato's wife. She's a graduate and former student of Roubai Girls Academy, making her an alumni; Yuwa can be seen in an old photograph with two of her friends wearing Roubai Academy's original sailor school uniform, which inspired Komichi to have Yuwa create her a sailor uniform of her own. 

Komichi's adorable younger sister and a third grader who attends elementary school.

Komichi and Kao's father and Yuwa's husband who is usually away on business, but he does make time to see his family whenever he doesn't have to work.

An idol that Komichi deeply admires. Her use of a sailor uniform in a water bottle ad is what inspired Komichi to adopt a sailor uniform.

Production
Akebi's Sailor Uniform is Hiro's first work published by Shueisha. Around half year before the end of his previous work, Yumekuri, he was reached out by the editorial department of Weekly Young Jump. He knew that it was impossible for him to carry out a weekly serialization and therefore had little interest to Young Jump. He however still had a meeting with them and surprisingly found out they could provide options other than weekly serialization.

Media

Manga
Akebi's Sailor Uniform is written and illustrated by Hiro. The series began serialization in Shueisha's Tonari no Young Jump website on August 2, 2016. The first volume was released on April 19, 2017. As of March 17, 2023, eleven volumes have been released.

Anime
An anime television series adaptation by CloverWorks was announced on March 26, 2021. Miyuki Kuroki is directing the series, while Rino Yamazaki is writing and overseeing the series' scripts. The character designs are provided by Megumi Kouno. Kana Utatane is composing the series' music. It aired from January 9 to March 27, 2022 on Tokyo MX and other networks. The 16 main cast members, under the name , performed the opening theme song , while Manatsu Murakami performed the ending theme song "Baton". A cover of the Spitz song  sung by Mitsuho Kambe (the voice of Oshizu Hebimori) is featured in episode 7. Funimation (now Crunchyroll, LLC) licensed the series outside of Asia. Muse Communication licensed the series in Southeast Asia.

On January 27, 2022, Funimation announced the series would receive an English dub, which premiered on January 29.

Episode list

Reception
By March 2023, the series has one million copies in circulation.

See also
 Super Cub, a light novel series also illustrated by Hiro

Notes

References

External links
  
  
 
 

2022 anime television series debuts
Anime series based on manga
Aniplex
CloverWorks
Crunchyroll anime
Funimation
Japanese webcomics
School life in anime and manga
Seinen manga
Shueisha manga
Slice of life anime and manga
Webcomics in print